Marea Motu (30 December 1989 Pukepoto, New Zealand) is a New Zealand Maori Professional Boxer.

Motu is currently ranked 2nd in the IBF in the Junior Featherweight division. She is a four division New Zealand champion, holding more New Zealand titles then any other female boxer. She broke the 14 year record set by Daniella Smith for holding the most titles in February 2022.

Amateur boxing 
Motu discovered boxing at the age of 13. Motu is a five time New Zealand amateur champion, winning two junior titles, and three elite senior titles. During her amateur career, Motu was trained by her mother Aloma Browne and fought alongside her sister Sally Motu, who also won a New Zealand National title. Motu won an World boxing event that was open invertational called the Ringside Bowl World Championship. Motu sister Sally fought at the Golden Gloves event in Queensland in 2016, unfortuanately Mea was unable to compete due to injury. Motu meet Isaac Peach during her amateur boxing years. Since 2020, Peach has been Motu manager and trainer.

Professional boxing

Professional debut, four wins in three months 2020 
Motu made her professional boxing debut against City Kickboxing Kickboxer Wendy Talbot in October 2020. Motu won the fight by unanimous decision. Motu made her television fight debut when she took on Sally Kaokao at Sky City Theatre in November 2020. Motu won the fight in quick fashion, winning by stoppage in the second round for her first TKO win. In December 2020, Motu fought 	Ayisha Abied for the first time out of the three fight they have in the future. Motu won the fight by Unanimous Decision. Motu would return to television her next fight in late December 2020 against Katala Hansen. Motu would finish the fight in quick fashion, finishing the fight in 18 seconds.

Two time New Zealand Champion 2021 
In February 2021, Motu would take on Ayisha Abied for the second time in their trilogy. Motu won the fight by Unanimous Decision with her fighting the full six rounds for the first time. In March 2021, Motu took on Tania Reid for the New Zealand National Lightweight title. Reid was well known for being the first ever New Zealand female to win the Australasian title. Motu won the fight by third round stoppage in dominating fashion winning her first professional boxing title. In April 2021, Motu return to television when she fought Toni Moki. Motu won the fight by first round stoppage. After the fight, Motu reach the ranking of 1st on Boxrec and 3rd P4P on Boxrec. Motu would go on to fight Michaela Jenkins back to back in May and July 2021 with the second fight for the New Zealand national Super Lightweight title. Jenkins is a former New Zealand National (Pro Box NZ version) Welterweight champion which she won on a Joseph Parker undercard in December 2018. Motu will not only win both fights against Jenkins, she will also capture her second New Zealand title, but this time in the Super Lightweight division. After the fight, Motu was originally scheduled to fight for a WBA regional title against Australian Beck Hawker. Motu was also scheduled to fight Gentiane Lupi for the WBU World title. However, due to COVID-19 Lockdowns, both fights got cancelled. In August 2021, Motu finished off her year with a fight against Maori professional boxer Rangi Hetet. Motu won the fight by Split Decision.

Record Breaking New Zealand Champion, World Ranked 2022 
In February 2022, Motu took on 	Ayisha Abied for the New Zealand National Featherweight title. If Motu won the fight, she would break a 14-year record that Daniella Smith set that was tied with Lani Daniels, Geovana Peres, and herself. Motu won the fight by first round Knockout winning her third professional boxing title. In February 2022, it was announced a super fight between Motu and Baby Nansen will happen in 2022 as soon as the Auckland lockdowns were over. Motu and Nansen fought on April 30 for the New Zealand National Super Featherweight title The fight itself was messy and close, however, Motu won the fight capturing her fourth New Zealand title. After the fight, Motu made her intentions clear that she wanted to take on New Zealand born Australian, IBF World Super Bantamweight champion Cherneka Johnson. If a fight between Motu and Johnson happened for the world title, it would be the first time in boxing history that two Maori women would compete for a World title. It would be second time for two New Zealand women to compete for a world title behind Lani Daniels vs Geovana Peres for the WBO World title. In June 2022, Motu received her first major international ranking, with her being ranked 10th in the IBF Junior Lightweight division. On 19 August, Motu took on Thailand National Bantamweight champion Thanchanok Phanan for the vacant PBCNZ International Featherweight title. Motu stated she aims to make an impression by knocking out her opponent. Motu won the fight by 4th round stoppage. On the 21st October, Motu took on former WBC World Bantamweight champion Usanakorn
Thawilsuhannawang. This is the toughest and highest credential boxer Motu has fought so far in her career. Motu won the fight by Unanimous Decision winning every round of the fight. On 26th of November, for the first time in her professional career, Motu fought overseas against undefeated Iran boxer Nastaran Fathi. This is the first time she will fight for a major regional title. Motu won the fight by Split Decision, winning the vacant WBC Asian Boxing Council Continental super bantamweight title. However, Motu received a bad cut during the fight. At the end of December 2022, Motu finished her boxing 2022 year with receiving a ranking of 7th in the WBA and 16th in the WBC in the Super Bantamweight division.

Boxing titles

Amateur titles 
 New Zealand National Amateur Championships
 2002 New Zealand Junior Flyweight Gold Medalist
 2005 New Zealand Junior Super Lightweight Gold Medalist
 2006 New Zealand Super Lightweight Gold Medalist (unopposed)
 2007 New Zealand Lightweight Silver Medalist 
 2015 New Zealand Featherweight Gold Medalist 
 2016 New Zealand Bantamweight Silver Medalist 
 2017 New Zealand Bantamweight Gold Medalist

Professional titles 
 New Zealand Professional Boxing Association
 New Zealand National Lightweight Champion
Professional Boxing Commission New Zealand
 New Zealand National Super Lightweight Champion
 New Zealand National Featherweight Champion
 New Zealand National Super Featherweight Champion
 International Featherweight Champion
World Boxing Council
 Asian Boxing Council Continental Super Bantamweight Champion

Professional boxing record

Personal life 
Motu was born and raised in the small village of Pukepoto which is outside of Kaitaia. Motu a New Zealand Maori with decedents of Te Rarawa and Ngāpuhi. Motu is a mother of four children, with her eldest David a championship Bowler. Motu was raised in the small town of Pukepoto. She moved to South Auckland when she was 10 years old. Motu got pregnent with her first child at the age of 17 with her boyfriend at the time. She would eventually marry her boyfriend. She would go through bad times with her family when she was living homeless. Motu would leave her husband after years of domestic violence abuse and her husband went to prison. For a short time, Motu moved to Australia where she met her new partner. This helped her turn her life around for the better. She moved back to New Zealand where she started train back in boxing.

Awards 
 New Zealand Boxing Awards
2020 Female Newcomer of the year (Won)
2020 Debut of the year (Won)
2020 Female Boxer of the year (Won)
2020 Boxer of the year (Won)
2021 Female Boxer of the year (Won)
2021 New Zealand National Champion of the year (Won)
2022 Most entertaining boxer of the year (Won)
2022 New Zealand National Champion of the year (Won)
2022 Female Boxer of the year (Won)
2022 New Zealand Boxer of the year (Won)
 Te Tai Tokerau Māori Sports Awards
 2023 Te Tohu TaKaro Toa Wahine Outstanding Sportswoman Award (Nominated)

References

External links 

1989 births
Living people
New Zealand women boxers
New Zealand professional boxing champions
New Zealand Māori sportspeople
Boxers from Northland
People from Kaitaia